The Hofstra University rape case was a 2009 false accusation of rape, in which an 18-year-old Hofstra University student, Danmell Ndonye, falsely accused fellow student Rondell Bedward and his friends Jesus Ortiz, Kevin Taveras, Arvin Rivera and Stalin Felipe of holding her down, tying her up and gang raping her in a university dormitory bathroom stall on the morning of September 13, 2009.

A few days later, these claims were revealed to be false when a video of the event was given to the police, which showed that the entire encounter was consensual. Ndonye retracted her claims, was suspended from the university and required to undergo mental health treatment. The prosecutor described her as "a deeply troubled woman". No charges were pressed.

Allegation and incident
Ndonye accused five men of raping her on the morning of September 13, 2009. She said that they had stolen her cell phone at a college party, and then used it to lure her into a bathroom stall, where they tied her down and took turns raping her as she screamed. She claimed that she tried to call for help, not realizing all five men were together. Four of the five men were arrested, held on $350,000 bail, spent three days in jail under protective custody, and all were charged with first-degree rape, which carries a possible 25-year prison sentence. Rondell Bedward was also suspended from Hofstra.

Kevin Taveras, one of the accused, said that Ndonye was accidentally separated from her boyfriend at an on-campus party and began making out with his nephew, Felipe. Taveras told investigators that she invited them to her dormitory room. Taveras told her he had friends, to which she replied, "Bring 'em along. It'll be hot." Felipe asked her if she was sure, and she replied, "Yeah, sure, I want to."

A few days later, a fifth member of the group, who had recorded the encounter, released the video which showed the encounter to be consensual. The five-minute video showed Ndonye having sex with two of the men. Ndonye admitted that the sex was consensual and said that she had lied because she did not want her boyfriend to think of her as a "slut". All charges were subsequently dropped and Bedward was reinstated at Hofstra.

Aftermath
Ndonye agreed in a private deal with the Nassau County District Attorney, Kathleen Rice, to do 250 hours of community service and one year of psychiatric counseling instead of facing charges.

Emily Bazelon of Slate wrote that cases like this invoke "raucous commenters [to] say women can't be trusted when they have sex they're not proud of", associating the incident with gray rape. The men involved said that, in prison, the false accusation made them "fear for their lives" and were "hounded as the lowest type of criminal". Stalin Felipe said the ordeal "traumatize[d] us". and that his "name is forever tarnished".

Amanda Hess of Washington City Paper wrote, "The meaningless squabbles between the two camps tend to overlook the fact that people concerned about rape and people concerned about fake rape accusations are both fighting against the same thing: rape culture."

Anna Rittgers of The Washington Times wrote, "Nevertheless, these young men suffered the threat of expulsion, imprisonment, incurred extensive legal costs, and had their reputations trashed in the media in the process. Worst of all, there are those who will always think those men are rapists, despite all evidence to the contrary."

In 2012, Ndonye agreed to settle a federal lawsuit filed against her by Rondell Bedward, but declined to discuss the terms of settlement.

References

2009 hoaxes
2009 in New York (state)
Hofstra University
False allegations of sex crimes
Hoaxes in the United States
Mass media-related controversies in the United States
September 2009 events